Vogue Williams (born 2 October 1985) is an Irish model and media personality, known for participating in Dancing with the Stars and Stepping Out and for winning the 2015 series of Bear Grylls: Mission Survive.

Early life and education
Williams was born on 2 October 1985 in Portmarnock, a suburb of Dublin. Her parents, Sandra and former car salesman Freddie, separated when she was seven, and her father died in 2010. She was the youngest of three siblings, after brother Frederick and sister Amber; she also has two half-siblings.

Williams attended the all-girls Santa Sabina Dominican College in Sutton.  After securing her Leaving Certificate, at the insistence of her property-developer stepfather Neil Wilson (who is best-known for establishing the IT company Datalex), she enrolled for and subsequently completed a degree in construction design and management at Robert Gordon University in Aberdeen. As part of her degree programme, Williams worked on building sites in London for six months. She returned to Dublin to undertake further studies in quantity surveying at the Dublin Institute of Technology.

Career
Williams' public career began on 11 November 2010, in an Irish reality TV series Fade Street, loosely analogous to The Hills, which followed the lives of four Irish girls in Dublin. The episodes included Vogue's work at Stellar Magazine, her acting studies and her interest in DJing.  On 15 April 2012, Williams began her stint in the twelfth series of Dancing with the Stars in Australia, partnered with Christopher Page; they were the third couple to be eliminated from the competition on 6 May 2012.  In 2013, Williams and Brian McFadden took part in the ITV celebrity dancing competition Stepping Out, finishing in second place.

On 4 February 2015, Williams was confirmed to be participating in the ITV reality series Bear Grylls: Mission Survive which started airing on 20 February 2015. She won the show on 3 April 2015, beating Kelly Holmes and Mike Tindall.  In December 2015, Williams appeared alongside Brian McFadden in a celebrity episode of Catchphrase. On 21 June 2016, she was a guest panellist on an episode of Loose Women. On 30–31 October 2016 she was a guest on Celebrity Haunted Hotel on W.

Williams presented her own four-part series called Vogue Williams – On the Edge, in which she investigated issues affecting the lives of fellow "millennials", for example drugs, social anxiety, gender dysmorphia and obsessiveness around 'the body beautiful'.  She was to take part in the fourth series of The Jump on Channel 4 in February 2017, but pulled out due to injury sustained whilst training. She was replaced by Amy Willerton.

On 4 June 2017, in the wake of terrorist attacks in Manchester and London, Williams wrote an opinion piece for the Sunday World entitled "Internment camps are grim necessity", which called for the establishment of internment camps for the detention without trial of "3,000 [Muslim] extremists living in the UK". She acknowledged that internment in Northern Ireland didn't work but that terrorists today could not be negotiated with. Donald Clarke of the Irish Times criticised her views as "illogical, totalitarian and profoundly sinister" and compared them to Breitbart and UKIP. He pointed out that internment in Northern Ireland drove Irish Republicans away from negotiation. He also criticised some response to her column as "predictably patronising, borderline sexist". Williams later said she had made a mistake and apologised for her stance, saying she had written it when she was frightened and angry and that her advocacy of internment was misguided. She also said she had received death threats.

In March 2020, Williams became the new host of Sunday Breakfast on Heart FM. In September 2021, she became the presenter on the Virgin Media One  talent show The Big Deal. In November 2021, she was announced as the host of a new virtual reality show called Send Nudes, about peoples' decisions to have plastic surgery.

Personal life
In May 2011, she began dating former Westlife singer Brian McFadden. Their engagement was announced on 12 January 2012 and they were married on 2 September 2012 in Florence, Italy. In June 2015, Williams purchased an apartment in Howth, near Dublin. On 7 July 2015, Williams and McFadden announced that they were separating after three years of marriage. The couple divorced in 2017.

Williams got engaged to reality TV star Spencer Matthews in January 2018; Williams and Matthews married on 9 June 2018. The couple have a son born in 2018, a daughter born in 2020 and a son born in 2022.

Filmography

Television

References

External links
 
 Official website

1985 births

Living people
Irish television presenters
Irish women television presenters

Matthews family (UK)

People from Howth